Ricky Nebbett (born 16 August 1977) is a former professional Rugby Union player whose career spanned 16 years.

Nebbett's position of choice was tight headprop. He was a part of the Leicester squad that won three league titles and two Heineken cups notably the 2001 Heineken Cup Final.

Nebbett was called up to the senior England squad for the 2001 England Rugby union tour of North America.

Nebbett played and coached Esher for a number of seasons and was their director of Rugby until 2018/19.

References

External links
Harlequins profile 
Leicester Tigers profile

1977 births
Living people
English rugby union players
Rugby union props
Harlequin F.C. players
Esher RFC players
Leicester Tigers players
Rugby union players from Kingston upon Thames